Herbert Heaton (6 June 1890 – 24 January 1973) was a British-born economic historian. He held posts at the University of Tasmania, Queen's University, Kingston, and the University of Minnesota, where he was head of the Department of History from 1954 until his retirement in 1958.

Born in Silsden, Yorkshire, England, the son of a blacksmith, Heaton was educated at the University of Leeds, the London School of Economics, and the University of Oxford.

References 

 https://adb.anu.edu.au/biography/heaton-herbert-6626
 https://www.nytimes.com/1973/01/26/archives/prof-herbert-heaton.html

1890 births
1973 deaths
Economic historians
Corresponding Fellows of the British Academy
Alumni of the University of Oxford
Alumni of the University of Leeds
Alumni of the London School of Economics
British expatriates in Australia
British expatriates in Canada
British expatriates in the United States